Perfect Records was a United States-based record label, founded in 1922 by Pathé Records to produce cheap 78 rpm discs.

From the start, Perfect Records sold well. The Pathé and Perfect labels were part of the merger that created the American Record Corporation (ARC) in July 1929. After the merger, ARC weeded out some of their poorer-selling labels (Pathé, for example), and Perfect continued to be a successful label through the 1930s until ARC dropped their entire group of cheaper labels in late 1938.

The label was revived in 1993 by Dean Blackwood and issued recordings pressed on 78 r.p.m. vinyl by Sun City Girls, Charlie Feathers, Junior Kimbrough, The Balfa Brothers, and John Fahey.

See also
 List of record labels

References

External links
Perfect Records on the Internet Archive's Great 78 Project

Record labels established in 1993
Re-established companies
Defunct record labels of the United States
Jazz record labels
Record labels established in 1922